Richard Craig Schofield (born November 21, 1962) is an American former professional baseball shortstop. He played 14 seasons in Major League Baseball (MLB) from 1983 to 1996 for the California Angels, New York Mets, Toronto Blue Jays, and Los Angeles Dodgers. Schofield was with the World Series champion Toronto Blue Jays in 1993, but did not play in the postseason that year, after missing the bulk of the regular season with a broken arm. He shares the record for most seasons having at least 400 at bats and fewer than 100 hits, having done it four times.

On August 29, 1986, Schofield hit a walk-off grand slam homer against Detroit to give the Angels a 13–12 victory and culminate an eight-run rally in the last of the ninth inning.

Schofield signed with the Los Angeles Dodgers in 1995 and finished his career with the Angels the following season, playing his final game on September 29, 1996.

He is the son of former Major League Baseball player Ducky Schofield, and the uncle of former outfielder Jayson Werth.

See also

Third-generation Major League Baseball families

References

External links

1962 births
Living people
American expatriate baseball players in Canada
Baseball players from Illinois
Billings Mustangs managers
California Angels players
Danville Suns players
Dunedin Blue Jays players
Edmonton Trappers players
Idaho Falls Angels players
Lake Elsinore Storm players
Los Angeles Dodgers players
Major League Baseball shortstops
New York Mets players
Redwood Pioneers players
Spokane Indians players
Sportspeople from Springfield, Illinois
Toronto Blue Jays players
Vancouver Canadians players